The Langeneß Wadden Sea Station is an information centre on the island (Hallig) of  Langeneß in the German Wadden Sea. It is located in the biosphere reserve of the Schleswig-Holstein Wadden Sea and Halligen. Since the station at Langeneß was founded, the house has been run by the Wadden Sea Conservation Station (Schutzstation Wattenmeer) and the World Wide Fund for Nature.

External links
 Homepage of the Langeneß Wadden Sea Station 

Culture of Schleswig-Holstein
Tourist attractions in Schleswig-Holstein
Education in Schleswig-Holstein
Nature centres in Germany